Bjarne is a Nordic male name, a variant of Bjorn, and can refer to the following people:

Bjarne Andersson, a cross-country skier
Bjarne Berg-Sæther, a Norwegian politician
Bjarne Berntsen, a Norwegian football coach and former player
Bjarne Brøndbo, a rock singer
Bjarne Brustad, a violinist
B. S. (Bjarne Slot) Christiansen, a team-building coach
Bjarne Mørk Eidem, a Norwegian politician
Bjarne Fjærtoft, a Norwegian politician
Bjarne Flem, a Norwegian politician
Bjarne Goldbæk, a football player and sports pundit
Bjarne Guldager, a Norwegian Olympic sprinter
Bjarne Håkon Hanssen, the current Norwegian Minister of Labour and Social Inclusion
Bjarne Hansen, a comics artist
Bjarne Henriksen, a Danish actor
Bjarne Henry Henriksen, a Norwegian politician
Bjarne Iversen, a cross-country skier
Bjarne Jeppesen, a handball player
Bjarne Johnsen, a Norwegian gymnast
Bjarne Kallis, a Finnish politician
Bjarne Liller, a jazz musician
Bjarne Lyngstad, a Norwegian politician
Bjarne Møgelhøj, a Danish politician
Bjarne Pedersen, a motorcycle racer
Bjarne Petersen, a football player
Bjarne Pettersen, a Norwegian gymnast
Bjarne Reuter, a Danish writer
Bjarne Riis, a bicycle racer
Bjarne Daniel Solli, a Norwegian politician
Bjarne Støtvig, a Norwegian politician
Bjarne Stroustrup, creator of the C++ programming language
Bjarne Tromborg, a physicist
Bjarne Undheim, a Norwegian politician

See also
Bjarni
Bjorn

Masculine given names
Danish masculine given names
Norwegian masculine given names